Hong Kong competed at the 2016 Summer Paralympics in Rio de Janeiro, Brazil, from 7 September to 18 September 2016.

Equestrian 
Through the Para Equestrian Individual Ranking List Allocation method, the country earned a pair of slots at the Rio Games for their two highest ranked equestrian competitors.  These slots were irrespective of class ranking.

Shooting

The third opportunity for direct qualification for shooters to the Rio Paralympics took place at the 2015 IPC IPC Shooting World Cup in Sydney, Australia.  At this competition, Yan Wo Wong earned a qualifying spot for their country in the P1- Men's 10m Air Pistol SH1 event.

See also
Hong Kong at the 2016 Summer Olympics

References

Nations at the 2016 Summer Paralympics
2016
2016 in Hong Kong sport